Tarzan and the Foreign Legion is a novel by American writer Edgar Rice Burroughs, the twenty-second in his series of twenty-four books about the title character Tarzan. The book, written June–September 1944 while Burroughs was living in Honolulu and published in 1947, was the last new work by Burroughs to be published during his life (Llana of Gathol, the tenth book in the Barsoom series, was published in 1948, but it was a collection of four stories originally published in Amazing Stories in 1941). The novel is set during World War II in Sumatra, Dutch East Indies. The term "foreign legion" does not refer to the French Foreign Legion, but is the name given in the book to a small international force (including Tarzan) fighting the Empire of Japan.

The book was offered to Argosy magazine, in 1945, for serial publication, as per every Tarzan story previously, but the story was rejected by them and returned. Burroughs published it himself, almost two years later.

Plot summary
While serving in the R.A.F. under his civilian name of John Clayton, Tarzan is shot down over the island of Sumatra in the Japanese-occupied Dutch East Indies. He uses his jungle survival skills to save his comrades-in-arms, and they fight the Japanese while seeking escape from enemy territory.

Tarzan also reveals to his companions how in his youth, after saving the life of a witch doctor, he was rewarded by treatment that gave him perpetual youth. His companions ask if he is also immortal and he says no. According to Tarzan Alive, Philip José Farmer's study of the ape man's life and career, the incident related occurred in January 1912.

Adaptations
The book has been adapted into comic form by Gold Key Comics in Tarzan nos. 192–193, dated June and July 1970.

References

External links
 
 ERBzine.com Illustrated Bibliography entry for Edgar Rice Burroughs' Tarzan and the Foreign Legion
Edgar Rice Burroughs Summary Project page for Tarzan and the Foreign Legion
Text of the novel at Project Gutenberg Australia 

1947 American novels
1947 fantasy novels
Novels adapted into comics
Novels set in Indonesia
Tarzan novels by Edgar Rice Burroughs
Royal Air Force mass media
Novels set during World War II